The Akchim is a river in Perm Krai, Russia, a left tributary of the Vishera. The Akchim flows into Vishera  from the larger stream's mouth.

References 

Rivers of Perm Krai